Ronald Whitefoord Smith (1855 – 8 August 1909) was an Australian politician.

Smith was born in Sandy Bay in Tasmania in 1855. In 1897 he was elected to the Tasmanian House of Assembly, representing the seat of Launceston. He served until his defeat in 1900. He died in 1909 in Hobart.

References

1855 births
1909 deaths
Members of the Tasmanian House of Assembly